Rijad Delić  is a Bosnian volleyball player at the highest national level.

He played for Bosnia's most successful volleyball club OK Kakanj, in the team which achieved the Premier League of Volleyball of Bosnia and Herzegovina national championship and the National Cup of Bosnia and Herzegovina double in the 2003-2004 season and for the 2004-2005 national championship winning team and the national cup winning team in 2005-2006.

Prior to joining OK Kakanj Rijad Delić played for most of his career for OK Zenica in the Premier League of Volleyball of Bosnia and Herzegovina (1996–2003).  He played as Opposite.

References

See also

Emir Bajramović, Almir Aganović, Ermin Lepić, Damir Bjelopoljak, Salih Fazlić

1973 births
Living people
Sportspeople from Zenica
Bosniaks of Bosnia and Herzegovina
Bosnia and Herzegovina men's volleyball players